Sari Johanna Raassina (born 19 April 1963) is a Finnish politician, representing the National Coalition Party in the Parliament of Finland since 2015. She was elected to the Parliament from the Savonia-Karelia constituency in 2015 with 3,978 votes.

References

External links
 Home page of Sari Raassina

1963 births
Living people
National Coalition Party politicians
Members of the Parliament of Finland (2015–19)
People from Jyväskylä